Knyazhaya is a rural locality (a village) in Kumzerskoye Rural Settlement, Kharovsky District, Vologda Oblast, Russia. The population was 20 as of 2002.

Geography 
Knyazhaya is located 45 km northwest of Kharovsk (the district's administrative centre) by road. Grishino is the nearest rural locality.

References 

Rural localities in Kharovsky District